Melaka Maju Jaya (Jawi: ملاك ماجو جاي) or Malacca, Onwards Come! is the official anthem of the Malaysia state of Malacca.

It was written and composed by Saiful Bahri, who also wrote the lyrics to the Selangor state anthem, Duli Yang Maha Mulia.

Lyrics

References

Notes

External links
 Anthem mp3

Malacca
Anthems of Malaysia